Flotsam and Jetsam is the twelfth studio album by the thrash metal band Flotsam and Jetsam, released on 20 May 2016. The song "Iron Maiden" is a tribute to the famous band. This is the only Flotsam and Jetsam album to feature drummer Jason Bittner, who left the band shortly after its release to join Overkill. The track "L.O.T.D." stands for "Legion of the Damned" and was originally written during the "No Place for Disgrace" sessions. "Forbidden Territories" was written by Mike Spencer when he was in Sentinel Beast (who also recorded a version in 2009), as well as a version re-worked by Sentinel Beast guitarist Barry Fischel and recorded by his band Fischel's Beast the same year.

Reception
The Sonic Abuse website wrote: "A brutal, thrilling album from start to end, it sees the band demonstrating their versatility and power in equal measure and the results are nothing short of astounding." UK Metal Hammer, rated the album 3 out of 5. Jason Arnopp wrote: "For some reason, Eric AK doesn’t always employ the classic tone that makes his voice unique, but whenever it does return the material feels more distinctive." German Metal Hammer rated the album 4 out of 5, Katrin Riedl wrote that the self entitled album marks a "new beginning" for the band. Sputnik Music wrote the self-titled album "brings back the 80s thrash vibe in a way that even the band’s No Place for Disgrace re-recording couldn’t pull off, and it blends it with the modern moody aggression of The Cold. This blend easily places it in the top 5 of Flotsam and Jetsam’s discography."

Track listing

Personnel
  Eric A. "A.K." Knutson — vocals
  Steve Conley — guitar
  Michael Gilbert — guitar
  Michael Spencer — bass
  Jason Bittner — drums

Charts

References

Flotsam and Jetsam (band) albums
2016 albums